Andrei Virgil Ciobanu (born 18 January 1998) is a Romanian professional footballer who plays as a midfielder for Liga I club Rapid București.

Club career
He played with Viitorul U19 in the Youth League in 8 games and scored 4 goals. Ciobanu made his debut in Liga I at the age of 17 and scored against the Romanian champions at that time, Astra Giurgiu; he has collected 101 matches since his debut and scored 12 goals, having also 16 assists.

On 16 June 2022, he transferred to fellow Liga I team Rapid București.

Career statistics

Club

Honours
Viitorul Constanța
Liga I: 2016–17
Cupa României: 2018–19
Supercupa României: 2019; runner-up: 2017

References

External links

Andrei Ciobanu at Liga Profesionistă de Fotbal 

1998 births
Living people
Sportspeople from Bârlad
Romanian footballers
Romania youth international footballers
Romania under-21 international footballers
Olympic footballers of Romania
Footballers at the 2020 Summer Olympics
Association football midfielders
Liga I players
FC Viitorul Constanța players
FCV Farul Constanța players
FC Rapid București players